Ainhoa Hernández Serrador (born 27 April 1994) is a Spanish handball player for Rapid București  and the Spanish national team.

She competed at the 2015 World Women's Handball Championship in Denmark.

References

External links

1994 births
Living people
Spanish female handball players
Sportspeople from Barakaldo
Handball players at the 2016 Summer Olympics
Olympic handball players of Spain
Competitors at the 2013 Mediterranean Games
Competitors at the 2018 Mediterranean Games
Mediterranean Games gold medalists for Spain
Mediterranean Games medalists in handball
Handball players from the Basque Country (autonomous community)
Handball players at the 2020 Summer Olympics
21st-century Spanish women